Elsa Merlini (26 July 1903 – 22 February 1983), was an Italian film actress. She appeared in 29 films between 1931 and 1976. She was born in Trieste, Italy and died in Rome, Italy.

Selected filmography
 The Private Secretary (1931)
 One Night with You (1932)
 Paprika (1933)
 Model Wanted (1933)
 The Flower Girl from the Grand Hotel (1934)
 The Lucky Diamond (1934)
 Ginevra degli Almieri (1935)
 Thirty Seconds of Love (1936)
 Adam's Tree (1936)
 I Don't Know You Anymore (1936)
 The Lady in White (1938)
 At Your Orders, Madame (1939)
 The Last Dance (1941)
 The Queen of Navarre (1942)
 Legs of Gold (1958)

References

External links

1903 births
1983 deaths
Italian film actresses
20th-century Italian actresses
Actors from Trieste